St Andrew's Church, Moretonhampstead is a Grade I listed parish church in the Church of England Diocese of Exeter in Moretonhampstead, Devon.

History

The church comprises an early 15th century tower, with a late 15th century nave and aisles.

In 1856–57, the church was re-pewed. The north side was started in October 1856 and the south side completed shortly afterwards. The medieval chancel screen was reportedly in a poor condition and removed.

A further restoration was carried out between 1904 and 1905. A stained glass window was added to the chancel in memory of William Henry Smith. A new chancel screen was erected to a similar design to that removed in 1856. All of the seating was replaced with oak pews. The wooden flooring in the aisles was replaced with Minton tiling. The old gallery at the west end of the church was removed, and the roof replaced by an oak wagon roof. The walls of the church had the plaster removed, and central heating was installed. The new altar was consecrated by the Bishop of Exeter on 6 April 1905.

Rectors

Organ

The organ was installed by Hele & Co of Plymouth in 1905 at a cost of £800 given in memory of Pauline Eugenie Tilby. The organ was opened on Thursday 15 June 1905 by Daniel Joseph Wood, organist of Exeter Cathedral. An electric blower was fitted in 1946.

It now comprises 3 manuals and 34 speaking stops. A specification of the organ can be found in the National Pipe Organ Register.

Organists
George Osborne Brown 1854 -  1860
Miss E.A. Treleaven 1860 - 1867
Mr. Rihill 1867 - ca. 1871
Miss Clack ???? - 1876 (daughter of the Rector)
W. Sanders 1876 - 1877
George Satterley 1877 - 1902
A.E. Chapman 1902 - 1903  (afterwards organist at St Barnabas’ Church, Dartmouth)
Miss Esther West 
A.W. Cooper 1906 - ???? (formerly organist at Lustleigh, and St Saviour's Cathedral, Pietermaritzburg, Natal).
A. Theodore Sanger 1909 - 1913 (afterwards organist at Cathedral Church of the Redeemer Calgary)
W.R. Weaver 1914 - 1916
Irene Chudleigh 1916 - 1924
W.R. Weaver 1924 - 1932
Mr. Cross ca. 1934

Bells
The tower contains a peal of 8 bells cast by Gillett & Johnston in 1922. They were dedicated by the Bishop of Exeter on 1 December 1922.

References

Moretonhampstead
Moretonhampstead
Andrew